Mbembe is a Cross River language of Nigeria. Odut, a divergent variety spoken in a village far South of the rest of Mbembe, had 20 speakers in 1980 and may be extinct.

References

Languages of Nigeria
Upper Cross River languages